Joan Marjorie Coxsedge (born 5 January 1931) is an Australian artist, activist, and a former politician. She was one of the first two women elected to the Victorian Legislative Council in 1979.

Born Joan Rochester, she is a native of Ballarat. After leaving school, she worked as a professional artist. She joined the Labor Party in 1967. A leading figure in the Victorian ALP's left wing, she soon became involved with the Save Our Sons Movement, opposed to conscription for the Vietnam War, and in 1971 (along with four other members of this movement) was imprisoned for anti-conscription activities. Two years later she was the founding chairman of the Committee for the Abolition of Political Police.

Her first attempts at gaining parliamentary office were unsuccessful. She stood for election for the Victorian Legislative Assembly at the 1973 and 1976 state elections, but failed to win a seat on either occasion. In 1979, nevertheless, she was elected to the Victorian Legislative Council for the Melbourne West Province. She served there until 1992.

External links
Interview with Joan Coxsedge
Parliament of Victoria: biography

1931 births
Living people
Australian Labor Party members of the Parliament of Victoria
Members of the Victorian Legislative Council
People from Ballarat
Women members of the Victorian Legislative Council